Alina Buchschacher (born 19 July 1991) is a Swiss business woman, model and beauty pageant titleholder who won the title of Miss Switzerland 2011 and represented her country in Miss Universe 2012.

Early life
Buchschacher is an International Business student and she can speak Swiss German and English.

Pageantry
Buchschacher was crowned Miss Universe Switzerland 2012 in an event held in the city of Lugano on 24 September. Following this win, Buchschacher competed in the Miss Universe 2012 beauty pageant.
Alina also won Miss Bern in 2011 and was the first and only person to ever hold two titles in the same year 2011 having won Miss Bern as well as Miss Switzerland

References

http://promiagent.ch/2011/09/24/alina-buchschacher-die-amtierende-miss-bern-ist-die-neue-miss-schweiz/

External links
Official Miss Switzerland website 

Living people
Miss Switzerland winners
Miss Universe 2012 contestants
1991 births